Local government elections took place in England (only) on Thursday 4 May 2006. Polling stations were open between 7:00 and 22:00.

All London borough council seats were up for election, as well as a third of the seats on each of the metropolitan borough councils, and a third of some unitary authorities and shire districts. Several councils elected half of their seats: these were Adur, Cheltenham, Fareham, Gosport, Hastings, Nuneaton and Bedworth, and Oxford. Local elections follow a four-year cycle, and the 2006 election was the follow-on from the 2002 elections.

Mayoral contests were held in the London boroughs of Hackney, Lewisham and Newham, and in Watford.  Crewe and Nantwich held a referendum on the issue of whether or not to have a directly elected mayor.

This was the first set of elections since David Cameron was elected leader of the Conservative Party. The Conservatives strengthened their position as the largest party in local government, making headway against Labour.

Summary of results
Note: Figures for number of councils and councillors is only in regard to those councils up for election in 2006, and does not include councils not up for election.

Turnout was 36%, compared to 40% in 2004 and 33% in 2002.

Pre-election predictions
On 7 April, a report produced by the University of Plymouth for Newsnight, based on results of council by-elections in the past three months, suggested that, compared to the 2002 local elections:
 Labour would increase their national vote share by 2% to 28% but that they would lose around 130 seats.
 The Conservatives would suffer a decrease in the national vote share of 4% leaving them with 33% and a loss of around 95 seats.
 The Liberal Democrats would increase their vote share by 2% to 29% and would gain around 190 seats.

This prediction may be seen to be almost entirely inaccurate.

Projected national share
In an analysis for the Sunday Times, psephologists Colin Rallings and Michael Thrasher, of the University of Plymouth, produced an estimate of the national share of the vote. According to their calculations, the parties would have the following share of the vote:

Conservative: 39%
Labour: 26%
Liberal Democrats: 25%
Others: 10%

They note that this is estimate not intended to predict the vote share in an actual general election, because voters often vote differently in general elections due to local issues, or to a wish to "fire a shot across the government's bows" without actually removing it.

The BBC had a similar national share prediction, based on the results of 950 key wards:

Conservative: 40%
LibDem: 27%
Labour: 26%
Others: 7%

Notable battles
 In Birmingham, the Acting Returning Officer announced that the votes in the Kingstanding ward had been incorrectly tallied, incorrectly giving a win to the BNP's Sharon Ebanks, whereas she should have been in third place. The only way in which this result can be corrected is for one of the candidates to raise a petition to the courts; the council has said it will support in any way it can any candidates who wish to raise such a petition. Labour's Catherine Grundy did so, and was declared the rightful winner.
 In Crawley, after three recounts, one result showed 500 votes for the Labour candidate and 500 for the Conservative. As per electoral law, the candidates subsequently drew lots. The Conservative candidate Adam G. Brown won, giving his party a majority and switching the council from Labour to Conservative control for the first time since 1971.
 Another count was tied in St Albans, this time between Conservative and Lib Dem candidates on 1131 votes each. The candidates drew lots with the Lib Dems winning, giving them a majority on the local council.
 In Chester the Conservatives were in third place in one ward, with around only 20% of the votes (in 2004), however they managed to win the seat with a majority of around 20%, and a 45% vote share. Their vote increased by over 110%, and was believed to be one of the largest increases in vote share (as a percentage) in the country.

Campaign launches
UK Independence Party (UKIP) launched their local election campaign on 28 March 2006, where they put forward their policies for the local elections which included: the reduction of council tax by 50%; local binding referendums on major issues; and giving councils control of business rates and letting them receive the proceeds from stamp duty.

The Liberal Democrats' campaign launch was held on 3 April and was led by Sir Menzies Campbell MP.

Labour's campaign for the local elections was launched on 5 April and was led by the Prime Minister, Tony Blair MP (Lab, Sedgefield) and the Chancellor of the Exchequer and Blair's expected successor, Gordon Brown MP (Lab, Kirkcaldy and Cowdenbeath) in the wake of rumours of a split between the two over when Blair should stand down as Prime Minister.

Respect launched their election manifesto on 10 April 2006 calling the local elections a referendum on New Labour.

The Greens launched their campaign on 11 April, having already announced that 1,300 candidates will be standing across the country.

The BNP launched their election manifesto on 14 April. Soon after, Margaret Hodge, the Labour Employment Minister, told the press that 8 out of 10 white voters in her east London constituency of Barking admitted being tempted to vote for the BNP, hinting that the party's share of council seats was set to increase.

The Conservatives launched their campaign on 18 April. David Cameron, Eric Pickles, Caroline Spelman and Peter Ainsworth fronted a press conference that focused on environmental issues.

Timeline

England

London boroughs

Metropolitan boroughs
One third of the seats in all 36 Metropolitan Boroughs were up for election.

Unitary authorities
One third of the council seats were up for election in 20 unitary authorities.

Derby council was in no overall control after the previous election in a Liberal Democrat/Conservative administration. After a by-election in July 2005 Labour gained one councillor off the Liberal Democrats, thereby gaining control of the council.

District councils

Half of council

Third of council
In 81 English district authorities one third of the council was up for election.

References

Bibliography
Local elections 2006. House of Commons Library Research Paper 06/26.
BBC Local Election Website
Schedule of elections (Electoral Commission)
Guide to England's 2006 elections  (BBC)
Overview (gwydir.demon.co.uk)
Online hustings, manifestos and candidates for Lambeth (electionmemory.com)

External links

The great local vote swindle - Electoral Reform Society briefing on the 2006 local elections

 
2006
Local elections